Heterotaxalus is a genus of beetle in the family Cerambycidae. Its only species is Heterotaxalus schwarzeri. It was described by Heller in 1926.

References

Pteropliini
Beetles described in 1926